Hieracium fendleri is a North American plant species in the tribe Cichorieae within the family Asteraceae. It is widespread across much of the western part of the continent, from the Black Hills of Wyoming and South Dakota south as far as Guatemala.

One stalk will produce 2-5 flower heads in a flat-topped array. Each head has 15-30 pale yellow ray flowers but no disc flowers.

References

External links
Photo of herbarium specimen collected in Nuevo León in 1981

fendleri
Flora of Mexico
Flora of the Southwestern United States
Flora of Guatemala
Plants described in 1861